Mount Lindesay, sometimes incorrectly recorded as Mount Lindsay, a mountain located within the Nandewar Range, is situated within the North West Slopes region of New South Wales, Australia. The mountain was formed by the Nandewar extinct volcano which ceased activity about 17 million years ago after 4 million years of activity.

The mountain was named by Sir Thomas Mitchell after Colonel (later Major General) Patrick Lindesay, a Scot commanding the military forces of New South Wales and who was the Acting Governor in 1831.

See also 

 List of mountains in New South Wales

References

Mountains of New South Wales
North West Slopes
Gwydir Shire